is an actress and model from Tokyo, Japan.  She is also known by her nickname, Yui-nyan.  As an actress she has appeared in several dramas (doramas), and in recent years she has concentrated more on her film career.  She played a minor role in the movie Ju-on: The Grudge and reprised her character for a bigger role in the sequel, Ju-on: The Grudge 2. She has portrayed Nana Komatsu (Hachi) in the film adaptation of the famous manga Nana, and on December 18, 2006, Ichikawa and co-star Mika Nakashima went to New York City for the International Premier of Nana 2 at the IFC Center.

Filmography

Films

Television

Video game voicing

Discography

Singles

Albums

References

External links
Official Homepage
 Japanese Entertainment and Language Lovers – Biographies, History, Videos and Galleries

Yui Ichikawa Galleries and Profile

Actresses from Tokyo
Japanese women pop singers
Japanese film actresses
Japanese gravure models
Japanese television actresses
Japanese television personalities
Japanese video game actresses
Japanese voice actresses
1986 births
Living people
Ken-On artists
21st-century Japanese actresses
21st-century Japanese women singers
21st-century Japanese singers